Clarence Williams III (August 21, 1939 – June 4, 2021) was an American actor. He played the character of Linc Hayes in the police television series The Mod Squad from 1968 to 1973. He also appeared in films such as Purple Rain, 52 Pick-Up, Tales from the Hood, Hoodlum, Half Baked, Life, American Gangster and Reindeer Games.

Biography

Early life
Born in New York City, Williams was the son of a professional musician, Clarence "Clay" Williams Jr., and grandson of jazz and blues composer/pianist Clarence Williams and his singer-actress wife, Eva Taylor. Raised by his paternal grandmother, he became interested in acting after accidentally walking onto a stage at a theater below a Harlem YMCA.

Career
Williams began pursuing an acting career after spending two years as a paratrooper in C Company, 506th Infantry, of the 101st Airborne Division. He first appeared on Broadway in The Long Dream (1960).  Continuing his work on stage, he appeared in Walk in Darkness (1963), Sarah and the Sax (1964), Doubletalk (1964), and King John. His breakout theatrical role was in William Hanley's Slow Dance on the Killing Ground, for which he received a Tony Award nomination. The New York Times drama critic Howard Taubman wrote of his performance, "Mr. Williams glides like a dancer, giving his long, fraudulently airy speeches the inner rhythms of fear and showing the nakedness of terror when he ceases to pretend." He also served as artist-in-residence at Brandeis University in 1966.

Williams' breakout television role was as undercover cop Linc Hayes on the popular ABC counterculture police television series The Mod Squad (1968), along with fellow relative unknowns Michael Cole and Peggy Lipton. Since the series ended in 1973, he  worked in a variety of genres on stage and screen, from comedy (I'm Gonna Git You Sucka, Half-Baked) to sci-fi (Star Trek: Deep Space Nine), and drama (Purple Rain).

Spanning over forty years, his career included the role of Prince's tormented father, who was also a musician, in Purple Rain (1984), A guest appearance in Miami Vice (1985), a recurring role in the surreal TV series Twin Peaks (1990), a good cop in Deep Cover (1992), a rioter in the mini-series Against the Wall (1994), and Wesley Snipes' chemically dependent father in Sugar Hill (1993). His other roles on television include Hill Street Blues, the Canadian cult classic The Littlest Hobo, Miami Vice, The Highwayman, Burn Notice, Everybody Hates Chris, Justified, and Law & Order. He can be seen in films such as 52 Pick-Up, Life, The Cool World, Deep Cover, Tales from the Hood, Half-Baked, King: A Filmed Record... Montgomery to Memphis, Hoodlum, Frogs for Snakes, Starstruck, The General's Daughter, Reindeer Games, Impostor, and as the early jazz musician Jelly Roll Morton in The Legend of 1900. He also played a supporting role as George Wallace's fictional African-American butler and caretaker in the 1997 TNT film George Wallace.

From 2003 to 2007, Williams had a recurring role as Philby Cross in the Mystery Woman film series on the Hallmark Channel. He appeared in all but the first of the eleven films alongside Kellie Martin (J.E. Freeman played Philby in the Mystery Woman first film). In the seventh (Mystery Woman: At First Sight) film, he reunited with his Mod Squad co-star Michael Cole. He played Bumpy Johnson in the film American Gangster. From 2005 to 2007 Williams had another recurring role as the voice of Councilor Andam on the Disney animated series American Dragon: Jake Long.

Death
Williams died in Los Angeles on June 4, 2021, from colon cancer at the age of 81. He is buried in St Charles Cemetery in East Farmingdale, New York.

Personal life
  Williams married the actress Gloria Foster in 1967. They worked together on The Mod Squad; Foster made two guest appearances.  The two also acted in a 1964 film The Cool World.  In 1984 they filed for divorce, but remained friends. They had no children. Williams announced Foster's death in 2021.

Selected filmography

Film

Television

References

External links
Clarence Williams III at AllMovie

1939 births
2021 deaths
20th-century American male actors
21st-century American male actors
African-American male actors
American male film actors
American male stage actors
American male television actors
American male voice actors
Deaths from cancer in California
Deaths from colorectal cancer
Male actors from New York City
Military personnel from New York City
United States Army soldiers
20th-century African-American people
21st-century African-American people
Burials at Saint Charles Cemetery